Diskoton was a major record label in SFR Yugoslavia, based in Sarajevo, Socialist Republic of Bosnia and Herzegovina. The company ceased to exist in 1992, with the outbreak of the War in Bosnia and Herzegovina. The studio was destroyed along with all master recordings

Background Company History 
Diskoton was formally established in 1972 in Sarajevo at the instigation of Asim Haverić, then an employee of the record label Beograd Disk (later to become Jugodisk). He persuaded Jovo Beatović, manager of the city public utility company Park in Sarajevo, to organize a record production company within his enterprise.

Record production began in 1973 and Diskoton operated as a subsidiary of Park until 1977, when it became an independent company. Diskoton premises were located in Pionirska dolina, a popular city park and zoo maintained by the Park company. The label acquired its name through a public call advertized by a popular magazine Ven, opting to pick a name suggested by young musician Brano Likić, later the founder and leader of the band Rezonansa.

Diskoton's first equipment were French-made automatic press machines Materiel Applications Plastiques (MAP) for 7" record manufacturing. In the earliest months of operation, due to unskilled staff, a large quantity of PVC was wasted because the machines turned out defected records, which were then trashed. Diskoton could manufacture only singles and EP records until the late 1975, when they acquired the equipment for manufacturing LP records as well as cassettes. Starting from 1980 Diskoton began occasionally using the service pressing of Jugoton pressing plant, while it became almost entirely dependent on the service pressing of PGP-RTB pressing plant by the late 1980s.

The most prominent A&R executives of Diskoton were Vajo Milošević and Slobodan Vujović, the latter being the former leader of the band Ambasadori.

With the outbreak of the Bosnian War, the company ceased to exist in 1992. The studio was completely destroyed along with all master tapes and recordings, meaning that most albums are unavailable in master quality (apart from the few that were released in the short time that Diskoton were producing CDs before its literal collapse).

Artists
Diskoton is notable for signing numerous eminent former Yugoslav pop and rock, as well as folk acts. Some of the artists that have been signed to Diskoton, include:

Amajlija
Ambasadori
Bajaga i Instruktori
Đorđe Balašević
Bele Višnje
Halid Bešlić
Bijelo Dugme
Goran Bregović
Zdravko Čolić
Arsen Dedić
Divlje Jagode
Raša Đelmaš
Duško Gojković
Osman Hadžić
Hari Mata Hari
Indexi
Safet Isović
Jugosloveni
Lepa Brena
Lutajuća Srca
Mugdim Avdić "Henda"
Srđan Marjanović
Seid Memić Vajta
Merlin
Kemal Monteno
Hanka Paldum
Josip Pejaković
Zoran Predin
Regina
Boba Stefanović
Jadranka Stojaković
Miladin Šobić
Tifa Band
Neda Ukraden
Milić Vukašinović
Zabranjeno Pušenje
Zana

Like other former Yugoslav labels, Diskoton also had a licence to release foreign titles for the Yugoslav market including notable international popular music stars such as:  The Commodores, Marvin Gaye, Gonzalez, Roy Harper, John Holt, Diana Ross, Tavares, The Temptations, Stevie Wonder, and others.

Competition
Other major labels in the former Socialist Federal Republic of Yugoslavia were PGP-RTB and Jugodisk from Belgrade, Jugoton and Suzy from Zagreb, ZKP RTLJ from Ljubljana, Diskos from Aleksandrovac, and others.

References

External links
Diskoton at Discogs

Yugoslav record labels
Yugoslav rock music
Record labels established in 1974
Companies based in Sarajevo
Bosnia and Herzegovina record labels